In statistics, a rank test is any test involving ranks. Examples include:
Wilcoxon signed-rank test
Kruskal–Wallis one-way analysis of variance
Mann–Whitney U (special case)
Page's trend test
Friedman test
Rank products